Community Independent School District is a public school district based in Nevada, Texas, USA. The district serves students in southeastern Collin County and includes the towns of Copeville, Josephine, and Lavon. A small portion of Hunt County also lies within the district.

The district was created in 1947 from the consolidation of the Josephine, Lavon, Nevada, Mt. Pisgah, Millwood and McMinn districts (Copeville's district would later join) and would become an independent district in 1974.  At that time, the school mascot (the Brave) would be selected.

In 2009, the school district was rated "academically acceptable" by the Texas Education Agency.

Schools
Community High School (Nevada) (grades 9–12)
Leland Edge Middle School (Nevada) (grades 6–8)
Carylene McClendon Elementary School (Nevada) (prekindergarten–5th grade)
Phyliss NeSmith Elementary School (Lavon) (prekindergarten–5th grade)
John and Barbara Roderick Elementary School (Josephine) (prekindergarten–5th grade)

In addition, the Mildred B. Ellis Education Center (Nevada) serves as flexible space for the rapidly-growing district.  For the 2022-23 school year it will house grade 6 students from Edge Middle School and grade 5 students from McClendon Elementary School.

References

External links
Community ISD

School districts in Collin County, Texas
School districts in Hunt County, Texas